Antonija Javornik (later, Natalija Bjelajac; 1893–1974) was a Serbian war heroine, nurse and sergeant in the Serbian army during the Balkan Wars and World War I. She was injured in combat twelve times and received twelve medals for bravery.

Biography 
Antonija Javornik was born in Maribor, in 1893. For Javornik, World War I started with the battles around Šabac, during the Battle of Cer, in which her uncle, Captain Martin Javornik, was killed. She received her second medal (the Miloš Obilić Medal) following these first military engagements. The war then took her to Belgrade, where she participated in the defense of the city. Together with the rest of the Serbian army, she retreated over the mountains of Montenegro and Albania and witnessed the death of many on the islands of Corfu and Vido. After a period of recuperation, she came to the Salonika front and participated in the Battle of Kaymakchalan, fought between 12 and 30 September 1916. After the fall of Kaymakchalan, the breach of the Salonika front and the liberation of Bitola, she received her most valuable medal, the Karadjordje’s Star with Swords. During the war, she participated in the bloodiest and most difficult war zones. She was awarded the Order of Karađorđe's Star, two  Obilić Medals, the Albanian Commemorative Medal, the Medal of the White Eagle, the Medal of Military Virtue, the Medal for Services to the Royal Home, the French Legion of Honor – Chevalier (highest French order of merit awarded to a foreign national), and the Russian Medal of St. George (III Class). She died in Belgrade, in 1974

See also 
 Milunka Savić
 Flora Sandes
 Leslie Joy Whitehead
 Olive Kelso King
 Women in the military

References

External links 

Оpanak/VELIKE SRPSKE RATNICE: Hrabre ratnice koje su se borile u Prvom svetskom ratu (in Serbian)
 Worldcat/Dvanajst ran – dvanajst odlikovanj Antonija Javornik, mariborčanka – srbska junakinja Natalija Bjelajac Marijan F. Kranjc, (2012), Str. 4-10. (in Serbian)
 Delfi knjižare/Žene solunci govore, Antonije Đurić, 2014. (in Serbian)
 Spomenici i obelezja srpskim zrtvama u Balkanskim i Prvom Svetskom ratu (in Serbian)

1893 births
1974 deaths
Military personnel from Maribor
Serbian nurses
Serbian women in World War I
Female nurses in World War I
Serbian military personnel of the Balkan Wars
Banjica concentration camp inmates
Serbian people of Slovenian descent
Female military personnel